José Clemente "Nonong" de Andrés (1947 – November 6, 2018), popularly known by his stage name Bangkay, was a Filipino actor.

Personal life and career
de Andrés never married and had no children. A Masbate native, de Andrés started his involvement in the entertainment industry as a layout artist for RVQ Productions. which was established by comedian, Dolphy.

de Andrés made his debut in acting as an extra in Kisame Street which starred Dolphy, Panchito and Nida Blanca. de Andrés was initially hesitant to take up an acting career, stating that he accepted the role just for fun, but eventually committed to it full-time.

He frequently took roles as an extra in horror and comedy films in the 1980s to the 1990s, appearing in more than a hundred films. He often played dead in several films which earned him the nickname "Bangkay". Due to low pay, de Andrés decided to leave show business and remain a bachelor for the rest of his life.

After retiring, Bangkay was entrusted to take care of a friend's son in Plaridel, Quezon until his adoptive son went to the United States to study college. Sometime in 2005, he began managing a beach resort owned by the town mayor, watching over the place for at least eight years.

Bangkay returned to acting, and took a role in Forevermore. He and fellow horror film colleague Lilia Cuntapay became known as part of a love team dubbed as "BangLi" due to their roles in the series. Because of this, he and Cuntapay were invited as hurados for It's Showtime's Magpasikat Season 6 in 2015.

Death
de Andrés died at the age of 71 on November 6, 2018, in Plaridel, Quezon, after a period of ill health.
His remains were interred at Loyola Memorial Park in Parañaque.

Selected filmography

Film

Television

References

1947 births
2018 deaths
Filipino male comedians
Filipino male film actors
Filipino male television actors
People from Masbate
People from Quezon